Jowyiviyeh (also Romanized as Jowyīvīyeh) is a village in Gughar Rural District, in the Central District of Baft County, Kerman Province, Iran. At the 2006 census, its population was 45, in 11 families.

References 

Populated places in Baft County